Borisoglebsky District was an administrative and municipal district (raion), one of the 32 in Voronezh Oblast, Russia.  As of the 2021 Census, its population was 70,407.

See also
Administrative divisions of Voronezh Oblast

References

Notes

Sources

Districts of Voronezh Oblast